The 1973 New Zealand Open, also known as Benson and Hedges Open for sponsorship reasons, was a combined men's and women's professional tennis tournament held at the Stanley Street grounds in Auckland, New Zealand. It was an independent event, i.e. not part of the 1973 Grand Prix or 1973 World Championship Tennis circuit. It was the sixth edition of the tournament and was played on outdoor grass courts and was held from 8 to 14 January 1973. Onny Parun and Evonne Goolagong won the singles titles.

Finals

Men's singles
 Onny Parun defeated  Patrick Proisy 4–6, 6–7, 6–2, 6–0, 7–6

Women's singles
 Evonne Goolagong defeated  Marilyn Pryde 6–0, 6–1

Men's doubles
 Brian Fairlie /  Allan Stone

Women's doubles
 Evonne Goolagong /  Janet Young defeated  Pat Coleman /  Marilyn Tesch 6–1, 6–3

Mixed doubles
 Evonne Goolagong /  Ross Case defeated  Janet Young /  Dick Crealy 6–1, 6–3

References

External links
 ATP – tournament profile

Heineken Open
ATP Auckland Open
January 1973 sports events in New Zealand
New